Chodsigoa is a genus of shrews in the tribe Nectogalini.

Species
There are currently ten species classified under the genus Chodsigoa:

Van Sung's shrew (Chodsigoa caovansunga) (Lunde, Musser and Son, 2003)
?Chodsigoa hoffmanni sp. nov. (Zhong-Zheng Chen et al., 2017)
De Winton's shrew (Chodsigoa hypsibia) (de Winton, 1899)
Chodsigoa hypsibia parva
Lamulate shrew (Chodsigoa lamula) (Thomas, 1912)
Lowe's shrew (Chodsigoa parca) (G. M. Allen, 1923)
Chodsigoa parca lowei
Chodsigoa parca parca
Chodsigoa parca furva (Anthony, 1941)
Pygmy brown-toothed shrew (Chodsigoa parva) (G. M. Allen, 1923)
Salenski's shrew (Chodsigoa salenskii) (Kastschenko, 1907)
Smith's shrew (Chodsigoa smithii) (Thomas, 1911)
Lesser Taiwanese shrew (Chodsigoa sodalis) (Thomas, 1913)

The name Chodsigoa has also been classified as a subgenus for the genus Soriculus in the same family.

References

Further reading

Archiv für Naturgeschichte. Berlin :Nicolai,1835-
Bibliographia zoologica. Leipzig :Wilhelm Engelmann,1896–1934.
Bulletin of the British Museum (Natural History). London :BM (NH)
Bulletin of the Museum of Comparative Zoology at Harvard College. Cambridge, Mass. :The Museum,
Checklist of Palaearctic and Indian mammals 1758 to 1946 / by J.R. Ellerman and T.C.S. Morrison-Scott. London :BM (NH),1951.
International catalogue of scientific literature, 1901–1914. London Published for the International Council by the Royal Society of London1901-1920
Mammals of Eastern Asia / by G.H.H. Tate. New York :The Macmillan Company,1947.
Mammals of the Kelley-Roosevelts and Delacour Asiatic expedition, by Wilfred H. Osgood. Chicago,1932.
Mammals of the Pacific world / [by] T.D. Carter, J.E. Hill [and] G.H.H. Tate. New York :The Macmillan Company,1945.
Papers on mammalogy, published in honor of Wilfred Hudson Osgood. Chicago :Field Museum of Natural History,1941
The Annals and Magazine of Natural History: Including Zoology, Botany, and Geology. London, Taylor and Francis, Ltd.
The big game of central and western China : being an account of a journey from Shanghai to London overland across the Gobi desert / by Harold Frank Wallace. London :J. Murray,1913.
The mammals of China and Mongolia / by Glover M. Allen. New York :American Museum of Natural History,1938–1940.
Zoologischer Anzeiger. Jena, VEB Gustav Fischer Verlag.
Zoologisches Zentralblatt. Leipzig:W. Engelmann,[1903–1912]

 
Mammal genera